Lehigh Street is a major road that connects Emmaus, Pennsylvania in the west to Allentown, Pennsylvania in the east in the Lehigh Valley region of Pennsylvania. The road is one of six roads that enter and depart Allentown, the third largest city in eastern Pennsylvania.

Lehigh Street is one of several major Allentown-area exits off Interstate 78, which runs from Interstate 81 in Lebanon County in the west to the Holland Tunnel and New York City in the east.

Lehigh Street also serves as a major commercial center for the Lehigh Valley. "Auto Mile", which includes approximately a dozen new and used automobile dealerships, is located on its western border with Emmaus. As the road enters Allentown from the west, it also runs by Queen City Airport, an Allentown airport used mostly by small, privately owned aircraft. South Mall, an enclosed shopping mall in Salisbury Township, is located on Lehigh Street.

The Emmaus side of Lehigh Street is the location of Shangy's, a beer distributor with the largest selection of domestic and global beers in the nation (over 3,000 in all).

History
General George Washington and his Continental Army staff passed up Lehigh Street (then called Water Street) following the Continental Army's victory at the Battle of Trenton. They stopped at the foot of the street at a large spring on what is now the property occupied by the Wire Mill, where they rested and watered their horses, and then went their way to their post of duty.

In 1941, from Cedar Crest Boulevard in Emmaus to  S. 6th Street and Auburn Street (what today is PA Route 145) in Allentown, Lehigh Street was designated as Pennsylvania Route 29. By 1960, however, the designation was removed and it was called Lehigh Street.

Route description

Lehigh Street is a continuation of State Avenue near South Mall in the northern sections of Emmaus. Upon crossing the Allentown-Emmaus boundary, it widens to a four-lane road with a center left-turn lane. From there, Lehigh Street runs northward traversing one of the busiest commercial districts in the city.

North of 29th Street SW, Lehigh Street interchanges the Interstate 78/Pennsylvania Route 309 overlap, continuing through an underpass east of Allentown Queen City Municipal Airport. The street runs away of the airport in its northward progression. At Lehigh Street's intersection with Jefferson Street, Lehigh Street narrows to two-lanes and turns slightly in a northeast course. North of 12th Street in Allentown, the street does not have the center left-turn lane.

A couple of blocks from South 12th Street, Lehigh Street intersects several Allentown-area roads and passes south of the abandoned Bicentennial Park. At Wyoming Street, Lehigh turns east and widens to three-lanes (two southbound and one northbound) and continues west past South 8th Street and Allentown's Albertus L. Meyers Bridge. It then heads eastbound as Saint John Street up to South 6th Street, also known as PA Route 145.

Lehigh Street westbound splits at the intersection with PA 145 (South 6th Street/Auburn Street) four blocks from downtown Allentown. The one-way roadway merges with Saint John Street, which then becomes Lehigh Street eastbound. North of this, PA 145 follows two-way Lehigh Street north, intersecting with Martin Luther King, Jr. Drive. Lehigh Street ends at the intersection with Union Street in downtown Allentown, where PA 145 splits into a one-way pair along that street.

Major intersections

References

Transportation in Lehigh County, Pennsylvania